Alinaqipalem is a small village near Choragudi Panchayat present in Pamidimukkala mandal of Krishna district of Andhra Pradesh state, India. It is situated at 80.86o E 16.23o N and at an altitude of 09 ft above sea-level. A survey by Madras Office in 1926 by Sri Govindarajulu and LGB Firth displayed it's assigned numbers. AP  supplementary survey in 1965 by Sri V. Sriramulu included it in Gannavaram Taluk of Krishna district.

It is mostly a Mason's village with 450 families.

It has an Urdu Upper Primary School with strength of 150 children.

Oral History

Ruler of Golconda and the last ruler of Qutub Shahi Dynasty, Abul Hasan Tanisha (A.D.1672-1686) invited Mullah Mohammed's Ali from Isfahan in Iran to come to India to teach his Children. Eldest son of Mullah, Haider Ali Naqi Isfahani and two families settled here. Other families joined and a small hub of Shia community gradually emerged. The village derives its name from the first settler and is called Alinaqipalem or Ali Naqi's Village.

References

Villages in Krishna district